Magnaporthiopsis is a genus of ascomycete fungi. It has three species.

Morphology 
Magnaporthiopsis is characterised by black and globose perithecia with a cylindrical neck, a double-layered perithecial wall, clavate asci with a refractive apical ring, fusiform to fusoid and septate ascospores, simple hyphopodia, and anamorph similar to Phialophora.

References 

Sordariomycetes genera
Magnaporthales
Fungal plant pathogens and diseases